Blended finance is defined "as the strategic use of development finance and philanthropic funds to mobilize private capital flows to emerging and frontier markets", resulting in positive results for both investors and communities. Blended finance offers the possibility to scale up commercial financing for developing countries and to channel such financing toward investments with development impact. As such, blended finance is designed to support progress towards the Sustainable Development Goals (SDGs) set forth by the United Nations. Meeting the SDGs will require an additional $2.5 trillion in private and public financing per year as of 2017 estimates, and an additional $13.5 trillion to implement the COP21 Paris climate accord. The concept of blended finance can contribute to raising the private financing needed. It was first recognized as a solution to the funding gap in the outcome document of the Third International Conference on Financing for Development in July 2015.

Building upon evidence from a previous survey done on behalf of the World Economic Forum, the OECD released recent findings which identified 180 blended finance funds and facilities, with $60.2 billion in assets invested across 111 developing countries and impacting over 177 million lives, demonstrating the tremendous potential of blended finance to close the funding gap required to finance the ambitious Sustainable Development Goals (SDGs) agenda and deliver development outcomes.

The concept has been gaining popularity lately within the world of international development finance. As a result, blended finance principles have been adopted by the Development Assistance Committee to guide the design and implementation of the concept, which aims to use development finance, including philanthropic resources, to align additional finance towards meeting the SDGs.

Terminology

The term blended finance implies the mixing of both public and private funds through a common investment scheme or deal, with each party using their expertise in a complementary way. The concept and model was developed within the Redesigning Development Finance Initiative from the World Economic Forum, who defined it as "the strategic use of development finance and philanthropic funds to mobilize private capital flows to emerging and frontier markets."

Rationale
The resources needed to bridge the funding gap to meet SDG requirements cannot be met through public resources (such as Official Development Assistance) alone, and private investment will be key to increasing the scope and impact of development finance and philanthropic funders. Only a small percentage of the worldwide invested assets of banks, pension funds, insurers, foundations and endowments, and multinational corporations, are targeted at sectors and regions that advance sustainable development. This is due to the fact that large-scale investing usually flows into environmentally destructive activities that come with higher economic incentive. The current challenge for the SDG era is how to channel more of these private resources to the sectors and countries that are central for the SDGs and broader development efforts. This is particularly important in a context where public resources are increasingly under pressure, while private flows to developing countries are increasing significantly. Blended finance is designed to fuel vast inflows of private capital to support these development outcomes.

Investors and commercial institutions are increasingly attracted to emerging and frontier markets, and this trend overlaps with the challenges faced by development funders, who face significant financial constraints and a lack of capacity or expertise in structuring transactions or sourcing deals. Thus, there is a good opportunity for these two trends to converge and there is a political will for effective public-private collaboration, presenting a real opportunity for investors and financiers to develop more effective strategies for managing their participation in emerging markets. 
Blended finance contributes to development objectives by:
Increasing capital leverage: Extends the reach of limited development finance and philanthropic funds as they are used strategically to facilitate larger volumes of private capital that are channelled to investments with high development impact
Enhancing impact: The skillsets, knowledge and resources of public and private investors can increase the scope, range, and effectiveness of development-related investments.
Deliver risk-adjusted returns: Risks can be managed to realise returns in line with market expectations, catalyzing private funds to development projects.

Supporting mechanisms
Supporting mechanisms have been traditionally used by development funders in a Blended Finance package to attract and support private sector investors by managing risks and reducing transaction costs. These mechanisms can generally be classified as providing:
Technical Assistance, or grant funds to supplement the capacity of investees and lower transaction costs.
Risk Underwriting, to fully or partially protect the investor against risk through appropriate risk mitigation
Market Incentives, guaranteed payments contingent on performance of future pricing and/or payment in exchange for upfront investment in new or distressed markets.

Blended Finance platforms
The Sustainable Development Investment Partnership and Convergence are two platforms that put blended finance into practice. Their goal is to bring relevant entities from the public and private sector together, connecting interests and resources to initiatives. Both of these platforms provide capital suppliers with access to a pipeline of individual blended finance project transactions, effectively scaling up the participation of both public and private investors in transactions.

Community of Practice on Private Finance on Sustainable Development brings together Development Assistance Committee members and private sector. 

While blended finance is showing promising initial interest and results, these platforms will help assess the efficiency of the model over time.

See also 

 Social Impact Incentives

References

Investment
Development finance institutions
Sustainability
Sustainable development